Julien Loubet (born 11 January 1985 in Toulouse) is a French former professional road bicycle racer, who rode professionally between 2005 and 2011 and 2015 to 2018 for the , , ,  and  teams.

Major results 

2003
 1st Classique des Alpes Juniors
 2nd Time trial, National Junior Road Championships
 9th Time trial, UCI Junior Road World Championships
2004
 1st  Road race, National Under-23 Road Championships
2008
 3rd Road race, National Road Championships
 4th Overall Vuelta a Burgos
2009
 2nd Overall Route du Sud
 10th Overall Paris–Corrèze
2010
 3rd Overall La Tropicale Amissa Bongo
1st Stage 2
 5th Overall Étoile de Bessèges
 9th Tour du Doubs
2011
 5th Grand Prix of Aargau Canton
2014
 1st Overall Tour du Maroc
1st Stages 4 & 10
 1st Stage 4 Tour de Gironde
2015
 1st Paris–Camembert
 1st  Mountains classification Étoile de Bessèges
 2nd Overall Circuit des Ardennes
1st Stage 3 (TTT)
 2nd Classic Sud-Ardèche
 2nd Tour du Doubs
 8th Grand Prix de la Somme
 10th Overall Route du Sud
2017
 1st Tour du Finistère
 4th Boucles de l'Aulne
 6th Overall Route du Sud
1st Stage 1
 7th Overall Tour de Luxembourg
 9th Overall Circuit des Ardennes

References

External links 
Profile at AG2R Prévoyance official website

French male cyclists
1985 births
Living people
Sportspeople from Toulouse
Cyclists from Occitania (administrative region)